The John Whitton Bridge is a railway bridge that carries the Main Northern railway line across the Parramatta River, located between the Sydney suburbs of Rhodes and Meadowbank.

First bridge

The original double track Meadowbank Bridge opened on 17 September 1886 as part of the construction of the Main Northern railway line. It was a lattice truss bridge designed by John Whitton, the Chief Engineer of the New South Wales Government Railways. In 2000, the original bridge was refurbished and reopened for bike and pedestrian use.

Second bridge
As part of plans to quadruple the Main North line, construction commenced on a new bridge to the west of the existing structure. The concrete piers were completed in 1952, before the project was cancelled. Work resumed in the 1970s, with a two-track box girder bridge opening in May 1980. The piers were extended to allow for a further two tracks to be built in the future. The new bridge was named after John Whitton.

See also

 List of bridges in Sydney
 List of railway bridges in New South Wales

References

External links

Flickr gallery

Bridges completed in 1886
Bridges completed in 1980
Bridges in Sydney
Parramatta River
Railway bridges in New South Wales
Main North railway line, New South Wales
1980 establishments in Australia
Steel bridges in Australia
Box girder bridges